The Faculty of Economics was one of fourteen faculties at the University of Tübingen. It was dissolved in 2010 in the course of an administrative reform, where the number of faculties was reduced from fourteen to seven. The faculty merged with the former Faculty of Social Sciences.

The Faculty of Economics was founded in 1817 as the first Economics Faculty in Germany (then named Fakultät für Staatwissenschaften)

Departments
The Faculty of Economics consisted only of the School of Business and Economics.

References

External links
Universität Tübingen: Wirtschafts- und Sozialwissenschaftliche Fakultät (official website)

University of Tübingen
Educational institutions established in the 19th century
Business schools in Germany